Marco Ferrando (born 18 July 1954, in Genoa) is an Italian Trotskyist activist and politician, the leading member of the AMR Progetto Comunista current in the Movimento per un Partito Comunista dei Lavoratori (Movement for the Communist Workers' Party), and a member of the Co-ordinating Committee for the Refoundation of the Fourth International.

In February 2006, in the build-up to the 2006 Italian general election, he was removed from the PRC's list of candidates for the Senate of Italy because of his support for the right of Iraqis to resist occupation, and criticism of Zionism.

When the PRC joined the current center-left government, the AMR Progetto Comunista left the PRC. After that, they dissolved and formed the Movement for the Communist Workers' Party.

He is an atheist.

References

External links
article on him
article from Workers' Party (Argentina) with photo
statement from AMR-PC with photo
Movement for the Communist Workers' Party Official Website(Italian)

1954 births
Living people
Politicians from Genoa
Communist Refoundation Party politicians
Italian atheists
Italian communists
Italian Trotskyists